Francisco Javier Andra Andra (born 15 July 1988) is a Chilean former footballer.

External links
 Profile at Cobresal

1988 births
Living people
Chilean footballers
Cobresal footballers
Chilean Primera División players
Association football midfielders
21st-century Chilean people